Schädler or Schaedler is a German surname. Notable people with the surname include:

Erich Peter Schaedler (1949–1985), German-Scottish professional footballer
Franz Schädler (footballer) (born 1968), former Liechtenstein football midfielder
Franz Schädler (alpine skier) (born 1917), Liechtenstein former alpine skier
Gustav Schädler (1883–1961)
Marco Schädler (born 1965), Liechtensteiner composer
Tino Schaedler (born 1972), German film art director

See also 
Lillian Schoedler (1891–1963), secretary of the New York City Intercollegiate Bureau of Occupations
Wilson Charles Schaedler (12/17/17-10/25/07), Shoe Last Designer

German-language surnames
Surnames of Liechtenstein origin